Alexandr Viktorovich Loginov (born 31 January 1992) is a Russian biathlete. He began his career in 2004.

Career
Loginov started his professional career in the late 2012–13 season, taking a bronze medal in pursuit in Holmenkollen and gold as part of the relay team in Sochi.

Doping case and suspension
Loginov was provisionally suspended by International Biathlon Union (IBU) on 25 November 2014 after re-testing of a sample of his from 26 November 2013 showed he had been doping with EPO. All his results from 26 November 2013 onwards were annulled, and he was handed a two-year ban from sports. The ban ended on 25 November 2016.

Return
Loginov returned to the sport in the 2016–17 season, winning bronze with the Russian relay team at the Biathlon World Championships 2017. In the next season, Loginov, while failing to finish in the top 3, improved his form, finishing 23rd in the overall standings.

To date, the 2018–19 season was his best one, as Loginov became one of the leading Russian biathletes. He won his first WC cup title in Oberhof, Germany, in a 10 km sprint, after two second-place and two third-place finishes.

In the 2019–20 season, Loginov finished third in the 10 km sprint stage in Hochfilzen and second in the subsequent pursuit stage. After nine stages of no podiums, he recovered at the Biathlon World Championships, which took place in Rasen-Antholz, winning his first World title in the sprint stage and finishing third in the pursuit event. He withdrew from the mass start race after thorough searches by the Carabinieri (Italian police) at the midnight hour, provoked by IBU Anti-Doping Manager Sarah Fussek-Hakkarainen, who had directed an inquiry to the law-enforcement agency of Italy.

Biathlon results
All results are sourced from the International Biathlon Union.

Olympic Games
2 medals (2 bronze)

World Championships
6 medals (1 gold, 1 silver, 4 bronze)

*The single mixed relay was added as an event in 2019.

Individual victories

*Results are from IBU races which include the Biathlon World Cup, Biathlon World Championships and the Winter Olympic Games.

References

External links

1992 births
Living people
Sportspeople from Saratov
Russian male biathletes
Biathletes at the 2014 Winter Olympics
Biathletes at the 2022 Winter Olympics
Olympic biathletes of Russia
Medalists at the 2022 Winter Olympics
Olympic medalists in biathlon
Olympic bronze medalists for the Russian Olympic Committee athletes
Russian sportspeople in doping cases
Doping cases in biathlon
Biathlon World Championships medalists
Saratov State Agrarian University alumni
20th-century Russian people
21st-century Russian people